Jaroslav Pollert may refer to:

 Jaroslav Pollert (canoeist born 1943), Czechoslovak slalom canoer who competed in 1960s and 1970s
 Jaroslav Pollert (canoeist born 1971), Czech slalom canoer who competed in 1990s and 2000s